The 1991–92 Kentucky Wildcats men's basketball team represented the University of Kentucky in NCAA competition in the 1991–92 season. The team was coached by Rick Pitino.

This season's team is one of the most fondly remembered in UK's long basketball history. Due to major recruiting violations committed by Pitino's predecessor Eddie Sutton, the 1991–92 Wildcats were coming off a three-year postseason ban where the team was not allowed to compete in tournament play. (Note the NCAA did not find Sutton personally liable.) The violations had mainly centered on alleged cheating by 1987-89 player Eric Manuel on the ACT college entrance exam and cash payments to the guardian of another former player, Chris Mills.

The 1991–92 season was the first year after probation when the Wildcats were allowed to compete and the only opportunity for the team's four seniors, who remained loyal to the program as opposed to transferring to teams allowed in the tournament. Three of these seniors were Kentucky natives. Together, all four would enter Kentucky basketball history as "The Unforgettables":
 Richie Farmer, a 6'0"/1.83 m shooting guard from Manchester, a small town in the commonwealth's eastern coal fields.
 Deron Feldhaus, a 6'7"/2.01 m forward from Maysville, a small Ohio River town in the Bluegrass region, about an hour's drive upriver from Cincinnati.
 John Pelphrey, a 6'8"/2.03 m forward from another eastern coal town, Paintsville.
 Sean Woods, the only non-Kentuckian "Unforgettable," a 6'2"/1.88 m point guard from Indianapolis.

Although the seniors were the heart and soul of the team, its biggest star was sophomore Jamal Mashburn, who would go on to become a consensus first-team All-American the following season and have a successful 12-year NBA career; he is now an NBA analyst for ESPN.

The Wildcats' run in the NCAA tournament would end in a regional final against Duke that is often cited as the greatest college game ever played. The heavily favored Blue Devils survived an overtime thriller on Christian Laettner's last-second shot at the buzzer.

Team legacy
The legacy of "The Unforgettables" was so great within the university that the UK program decided to retire the players' jerseys (but not their numbers) almost immediately after their final tournament game. (While jersey retirement is not uncommon, it is rare for a school to bestow this honor so soon after a player's career ends.) The team also went on a post-tournament all-county exhibition tour, where thousands of Kentuckians gathered in high school gyms across the commonwealth to meet and express pride in the team.

National and local sports news outlets continued to cover the players in "where are they now" and similar features for at least 25 years after the tournament. In 2005, a documentary film about the team, "Beyond the Glory," was released.

Schedule and results

|-
!colspan=9 style=| Regular Season

|-
!colspan=9 style=| SEC Tournament

|-
!colspan=9 style=| NCAA Tournament

NCAA basketball tournament 
East
Kentucky (2) 88, Old Dominion (15) 69
Kentucky 106, Iowa State (10) 98
Kentucky 87, Massachusetts (3) 77
Duke (1) 104, Kentucky 103 (OT)

Rankings

Team players drafted into the NBA
Jamal Mashburn of the Wildcats was claimed in the 1992 NBA draft.

References

Kentucky Wildcats
Kentucky Wildcats men's basketball seasons
Wild
Wild
Kentucky